Aluthakanniar  is a river flowing in the Tirunelveli district of the Indian state of Tamil Nadu. It is one of the tributaries of Chittar River, which joins Tamiraparani near Tirunelveli. It arises in the eastern slopes of the Western Ghats, and forms the Old Kutralam falls as it descends down the mountain. It flows  towards northeast before joining its main river Chittar near Kadapagothi village.

References

See also 
List of rivers of Tamil Nadu

Rivers of Tamil Nadu
Geography of Tirunelveli district
Rivers of India